Joseph Gardiner Absolom Bambrick (3 November 1905 – 13 October 1983) was a Northern Irish footballer who played for Chelsea, Walsall, Glentoran, and Linfield.

A former gas worker of medium build, he was a prolific goalscorer in the Irish League and the Football League, adept at getting into good scoring positions and athletic enough to make the final touch count. "Head, heel, or toe, slip it to Joe" became a famous catch-phrase when referring to him. His scoring of six goals for Ireland v Wales at Celtic Park on 1 February 1930 in a 7–0 win, still remains the record score for a British Isles player in an international fixture.

Club career

Irish League
Bambrick began his professional career with Glentoran, spending a season there before moving to Belfast rivals Linfield. His scoring record with Linfield was phenomenal: he scored a total of 286 league goals in just 183 games, 50 of these coming in the 1930–31 season, which was the highest in the world that year and a then record in British football. In total that season he managed 96 goals in all competitions, and his overall goal tally for Linfield was 509 goals managed in just 8 years, finishing as Irish League top scorer on four occasions.

Chelsea
On 24 December 1935, Bambrick signed for English side Chelsea for a fee of £3,000, making his debut the following day (Christmas Day) against Aston Villa. He then scored his first goal the day after (Boxing Day) also against Aston Villa at Villa Park. Bambrick scored Chelsea's goal in their highest-attended competitive match at their ground Stamford Bridge. A crowd of 82,905 watched the 1–1 draw with local rivals Arsenal on 12 October 1935. In total, he scored 38 goals in 66 appearances for Chelsea, including four hat-tricks (on two of these occasions he managed four goals).

Walsall
Bambrick gradually fell out of favour, losing the number 9 shirt to George Mills, transferring to Walsall in July 1938 where he spent a season before the outbreak of World War II led to his retirement. He returned to Linfield as a coach, but Walsall retained his registration and refused to release him to play for Linfield in war-time competitions. He eventually played for Linfield in the 1943 County Antrim Shield when he scored his final goal.

International career
Bambrick scored 12 goals in 11 games for Ireland, including six in one game against Wales. His goal tally ensures that he still ranks as the joint-fourth highest goalscorer for the Northern Ireland national side.

International goals
 
Scores and results list Northern Ireland's goal tally first.

See also 
 List of men's footballers with 500 or more goals

References

External links

1905 births
1983 deaths
Chelsea F.C. players
NIFL Premiership players
Glentoran F.C. players
Linfield F.C. players
Association footballers from Northern Ireland
Association footballers from Belfast
Pre-1950 IFA international footballers
Walsall F.C. players
Association football forwards
English Football League players
Northern Ireland amateur international footballers
Irish League representative players